Huw M. L. Davies FRSC is a Welsh chemist who has been Asa Griggs Candler Professor of Organic Chemistry at Emory University since 2008.

Born in Aberystwyth, Wales he graduated with a first-class degree in Chemistry from Cardiff University in 1977 and completed his PhD at the University of East Anglia in 1980. After a post-doctoral position at Princeton University he joined the faculty at Wake Forest University where he became a full professor. He subsequently joined the University at Buffalo where he held the positions of UB Distinguished Professor and Larkin Professor of Organic Chemistry. In 2008, he moved to Emory University.

Professor Davies’ research involves the development of new synthetic methods and their applications in total synthesis and drug discovery. His program covers design of chiral catalysts, carbenoid chemistry, development of new synthetic methodology, total synthesis of biologically active natural products, and development of chiral therapeutic agents. Many research groups have used his chiral dirhodium catalysts.

References

External links
 A video interview of Professor Davies

Year of birth missing (living people)
Living people
Alumni of Cardiff University
Alumni of the University of East Anglia
Wake Forest University faculty
University at Buffalo faculty
Emory University faculty
Fellows of the Royal Society of Chemistry
Fellows of the American Chemical Society
Fellows of the American Association for the Advancement of Science
People from Aberystwyth